Coonagh ( "descendants of Cuana") is a barony in the northeast of County Limerick in Ireland. The towns of Cappamore, Kilteely, Doon, and Oola are in the barony.

References

Baronies of County Limerick